The Râușor (in its upper course also: Boteanu) is a right tributary of the river Dâmbovița in Romania. It flows into the Dâmbovița in Rucăr.

Tributaries

The following rivers are tributaries to the river Râușor (from source to mouth):

Left: Valea Lupului
Right: Bugheanu, Măra, Purdel, Strâmba, Orzea, Grozea, Valea Râsului, Cămârzanu, Pârâul Podurilor, Valea Andreiașului

References

Rivers of Romania
Rivers of Argeș County